Daniel Hugentobler (born 15 January 1979 in Zürich) is a Swiss ice dancer. With sister Eliane Hugentobler, he is the 1998-2002 Swiss national champion. They competed at the 2002 Winter Olympics, where they placed 14th. The Hugentoblers were coached by Natalia Linichuk and Gennadi Karponosov.

Programs

Results
(ice dance with Eliane Hugentobler)

References

External links
 

Swiss male ice dancers
Olympic figure skaters of Switzerland
Figure skaters at the 2002 Winter Olympics
1979 births
Living people